Skåre is a former municipality in Rogaland county, Norway.  The  municipality existed from 1881 until 1958 when it was merged into the neighboring town of Haugesund.  Originally, Skåre encompassed the far northwestern corner of Rogaland county on the mainland, plus several islands off the western coast. Today, Skåre refers to the northern part of the town of Haugesund.

History
The municipality of Skaare (later, the spelling was changed to Skåre) was created on 1 November 1881 when it was split off from the municipality of Torvastad. The new municipality had a population of 1,665. On 1 January 1911, a part of Skåre (population: 3,847) bordering the neighboring town of Haugesund was transferred to Haugesund. On 1 January 1958, the rest of Skåre (population: 6,772) was merged with the town of Haugesund, creating a much larger Haugesund Municipality.

Government
All municipalities in Norway, including Skåre, are responsible for primary education (through 10th grade), outpatient health services, senior citizen services, unemployment and other social services, zoning, economic development, and municipal roads.  The municipality is governed by a municipal council of elected representatives, which in turn elects a mayor.

Municipal council
The municipal council  of Skåre was made up of 25 representatives that were elected to four year terms.  The party breakdown of the final municipal council was as follows:

See also
List of former municipalities of Norway

References

Haugesund
Former municipalities of Norway
1881 establishments in Norway
1958 disestablishments in Norway